Bis(cyclooctatetraene)iron is an organoiron compound with the formula Fe(C8H8)2, abbreviated Fe(COT)2. It is an air-sensitive black solid that is soluble in diethyl ether and aromatic solvents. The compound decomposes in solution after a few days even under inert atmosphere. It has no known practical applications but has been studied as a soluble source of Fe(0).

Preparation
The laboratory synthesis of Fe(COT)2, using Schlenk techniques, involves reduction of ferric acetylacetonate by triethylaluminium in the presence of 1,3,5,7-cyclooctatetraene:
Fe(C5H7O2)3 + 2 C8H8 + 3 Al(C2H5)3 → Fe(C8H8)2 + 3 Al(C2H5)2(C5H7O2) +  C2H4 +  C2H6

Structure
According to analysis by single crystal X-ray crystallography, the two cyclooctatetraene rings bind differently to the Fe center, leading to the description Fe(η4-C8H8)(η6-C8H8).  One cyclooctatetraene ring binds to Fe with two adjacent double bonds. This interaction is similar to that in (η4-C8H8)Fe(CO)3. The two planar groups formed by carbon atoms 1,2,7,8 and carbon atoms 3,4,5,6,7 form a dihedral angle of 33°. The second cyclooctatetraene ring binds through three double bonds. The shape and coordination of the lower ring is similar to that in (η6-C8H8)Mo(CO)3. The non-coordinated double bond has a similar bond length as an ordinary double bond.

In solution, Fe(C8H8)2 is a fluxional molecule such that its 1H NMR spectrum consists of a singlet at room-temperature.

References

Organoiron compounds
Sandwich compounds
Iron(0) compounds